Andrew Stephen Oldham (born 1978) is a United States circuit judge of the United States Court of Appeals for the Fifth Circuit and former General Counsel to Texas Governor Greg Abbott.

Education 

Oldham graduated from the University of Virginia in 2001 with a Bachelor of Arts with highest honors. He then studied at the University of Cambridge on a Harry S. Truman Scholarship, receiving a Master of Philosophy with distinction in 2002. He then attended Harvard Law School, where he was an editor of the Harvard Journal of Law and Public Policy and a semi-finalist in the Ames Moot Court Competition. He graduated in 2005 with a Juris Doctor magna cum laude.

Career 

After law school, Oldham served as a law clerk to judge David B. Sentelle of the U.S. Court of Appeals for the District of Columbia Circuit from 2005 to 2006. He worked as an attorney-adviser in the U.S. Department of Justice's Office of Legal Counsel from 2006 to 2008, as part of President George W. Bush's administration. He then clerked for justice Samuel Alito of the U.S. Supreme Court from 2008 to 2009, where he was a co-clerk with Michael H. Park. 

Oldham entered private practice at the law firm Kellogg, Hansen, Todd, Figel & Frederick in Washington, D.C.  His practice focused on appellate litigation in federal courts of appeals throughout the country. Prior to that he served in the Office of the Solicitor General of Texas as Deputy Solicitor General, where he represented Texas in federal courts across the country. In 2015, Oldham wrote an amicus curiae brief in support of Abbott's successful challenge of President Barack Obama's Deferred Action for Childhood Arrivals executive order.

Prior to becoming a judge, he served as general counsel to governor Greg Abbott, where he advised the governor on a range of issues under federal and state law and managed litigation in which the Governor is an interested party. 

Abbott appointed Oldham as general counsel to replace Jimmy Blacklock, who left to take a seat on the Supreme Court of Texas.

Oldham has been an adjunct professor at the University of Texas School of Law since 2019. He has been a member of the Federalist Society since 2002.

Federal judicial service 

On February 12, 2018, President Donald Trump announced his intent to nominate Oldham to an undetermined seat on the United States Court of Appeals for the Fifth Circuit. On February 15, 2018, his nomination was sent to the Senate. President Trump nominated Oldham to the seat vacated by Judge Edward C. Prado, who had become the United States Ambassador to Argentina. On April 25, 2018, a hearing on his nomination was held before the Senate Judiciary Committee. On May 24, 2018, his nomination was reported out of the Senate Judiciary Committee by an 11–10 vote. On July 17, 2018, the United States Senate voted 50–49 to invoke cloture on his nomination. On July 18, 2018, his nomination was confirmed by a 50–49 vote. He received his judicial commission on July 19, 2018.

See also 
 List of law clerks of the Supreme Court of the United States (Seat 8)

References

External links 
 
 Appearances at the U.S. Supreme Court from the Oyez Project
 

|-

1978 births
Living people
21st-century American lawyers
21st-century American judges
Alumni of the University of Cambridge
Federalist Society members
Harvard Law School alumni
Judges of the United States Court of Appeals for the Fifth Circuit
Law clerks of the Supreme Court of the United States
Lawyers from Richmond, Virginia
Lawyers from Washington, D.C.
Texas lawyers
United States court of appeals judges appointed by Donald Trump
United States Department of Justice lawyers
University of Texas School of Law faculty
University of Virginia alumni